In Canada, the 1958 Governor General's Awards for Literary Merit were the twenty-second such awards.  The awards in this period were an honour for the authors but had no monetary prize.

Winners
Fiction: Colin McDougall, Execution.
Poetry or Drama: James Reaney, A Suit of Nettles.
Non-Fiction: Pierre Berton, Klondike.
Non-Fiction: Joyce Hemlow, The History of Fanny Burney.
Juvenile: Edith L. Sharp, Nkwala.

Governor General's Awards
Governor General's Awards
Governor General's Awards